Workers Party of Acapulco was a local political party in Acapulco, Mexico. POA was founded in 1919 by Juan R. Escudero. POA published Regeneración.

Defunct political parties in Mexico
Political parties established in 1919